A statute is a formal written enactment of a legislative authority that governs the legal entities of a city, state, or country by way of consent. Typically, statutes command or prohibit something, or declare policy. Statutes are rules made by legislative bodies; they are distinguished from case law or precedent, which is decided by courts, and regulations issued by government agencies.

Publication and organization

In virtually all countries, newly enacted statutes are published and distributed so that everyone can look up the statutory law. This can be done in the form of a government gazette which may include other kinds of legal notices released by the government, or in the form of a series of books whose content is limited to legislative acts.  In either form, statutes are traditionally published in chronological order based on date of enactment. 

A universal problem encountered by lawmakers throughout human history is how to organize published statutes. Such publications have a habit of starting small but growing rapidly over time, as new statutes are enacted in response to the exigencies of the moment. Eventually, persons trying to find the law are forced to sort through an enormous number of statutes enacted at various points in time to determine which portions are still in effect.
   
The solution adopted in many countries is to organize existing statutory law in topical arrangements (or "codified") within publications called codes, then ensure that new statutes are consistently drafted so that they add, amend, repeal or move various code sections. In turn, in theory, the code will thenceforth reflect the current cumulative state of the statutory law in that jurisdiction.  In many nations statutory law is distinguished from and subordinate to constitutional law.

Alternative meanings

International law
The term statute is also used to refer to an International treaty that establishes an institution, such as the Statute of the European Central Bank, a protocol to the international courts as well, such as the Statute of the International Court of Justice and the Rome Statute of the International Criminal Court. Statute is also another word for law. The term was adapted from England in about the 18th century.

Autonomy statute
In the autonomous communities of Spain, an autonomy statute is a legal document similar to the constitution of a federated state, save that it is enacted by the national legislature, rather than the autonomous community it governs. The autonomy statutes in Spain have the rank of ley orgánica (organic law), a category of special legislation reserved only for the main institutions and issues and mentioned in the constitution (the highest ranking legal instrument in Spain). Leyes orgánicas rank between the constitution and ordinary laws. The name was chosen, among others, to avoid confusion with the term constitution (i.e. the Spanish constitution of 1978).

Religious statutes

Biblical terminology
In biblical terminology,  statute (Hebrew choq) refers to a law given without any reason or justification. The classic example is the statute regarding the Red Heifer.(Numbers 19:2)

The opposite of a chok is a mishpat, a law given for a specified reason, e.g. the Sabbath laws, which were given because "God created the world in six days, but on the seventh day He rested" (Genesis 2:2–3).

Dharma
That which upholds, supports or maintains the regulatory order of the universe meaning the Law or Natural Law. This is a concept of central importance in Indian philosophy and religion.

See also
Constitution
Legislation
Legislature
Organic statute
Statutory law
Super statute

References

External links

Legal research
Sources of law
Statutory law

no:Statutt